The 94th Battalion (New Ontario), CEF, was an infantry battalion of the Great War Canadian Expeditionary Force. The 94th Battalion was authorized on 22 December 1915 and embarked for Britain on 28 June 1916, where, on 18 July 1916, its personnel were absorbed by the 17th Reserve Battalion, CEF and the 32nd Battalion, CEF,  to provide reinforcements for the Canadian Corps in the field. The battalion disbanded on 27 July 1918.

The 94th Battalion recruited in Port Arthur, Fort William, Kenora, Rainy River, Fort Frances and Dryden, Ontario and was mobilized at Port Arthur.

The 94th Battalion was commanded by Lt.-Col. H.A.C. Machin from 28 June 1916 to 18 July 1916.

The 94th Battalion was awarded the battle honour THE GREAT WAR 1916.

In 1920 the perpetuation of battalion was assigned to the Lake Superior Regiment. A year later in 1921, the perpetuation was reassigned to the Kenora Light Infantry, which is now the 116th Independent Field Battery, RCA.
 1920–1921: 2nd Battalion (94th Battalion, CEF), The Lake Superior Regiment
 1921–1936: 1st Battalion (94th Battalion, CEF), The Kenora Light Infantry
 1936–1940: 16th Medium Battery (Howitzer) and 17th Medium Battery (Howitzer), RCA
 1940–1943: 16th (Reserve) Medium Battery (Howitzer) and 17th (Reserve) Medium Battery (Howitzer), RCA
 1943–1946: 16th (Reserve) Medium Battery (Howitzer) and 16th/17th Medium Battery, RCA
 1946–1965: 116th Medium Battery, RCA
 1965–1981: 116th Field Battery, RCA
 1981–present: 116th Independent Field Battery, RCA

References

Sources
Canadian Expeditionary Force 1914–1919 by Col. G.W.L. Nicholson, CD, Queen's Printer, Ottawa, Ontario, 1962

094
Military units and formations of Ontario